Hannaliis Jaadla (born 12 July 1986) is an Estonian footballer who plays as a defender for English club Oxford United and for the Estonia national team. As well as playing for Tammeka Tartu and Flora Tallinn of the Naiste Meistriliiga, she previously turned out for Tottenham Hotspur in England.

Club career

After beginning her senior career with Tammeka Tartu, Jaadla signed for their Naiste Meistriliiga rivals Flora Tallinn in 2011. She had a brief spell with Swedish club Umeå Södra FF in 2009.

During the 2011–12 season, Estonian national team coach Keith Boanas arranged for Jaadla to join Tottenham Hotspur, coached by Karen Hills who played for Boanas at Charlton Athletic. Boanas said: "This co–operation greatly aids the development of the players and they bring new things back to Estonia that inspires other players."

She played with the St Antony's/Nuffield/Wolfson/St Cross Foxes and won the Oxford University Football Association Women's Cuppers Tournament in 2015. In March 2015 Jaadla was signed by English FA WSL 2 club Oxford United.

International career

She is a member of the Estonia women's national football team.

Personal life
In addition to her football career, Jaadla is a historian and academic. Her research has focused on infant mortality in 19th century Tartu.

References

External links
 

1986 births
Living people
Sportspeople from Viljandi
Women's association football defenders
Estonian women's footballers
Estonia women's international footballers
Estonian expatriate footballers
Expatriate women's footballers in England
Estonian expatriate sportspeople in England
FA Women's National League players
Women's Super League players
Tottenham Hotspur F.C. Women players
Oxford United W.F.C. players
Expatriate women's footballers in Sweden
Estonian expatriate sportspeople in Sweden
FC Flora (women) players